The Ramsey–Lewis method is a method for defining terms found in theoretical frameworks (such as in scientific theories), credited to Frank P. Ramsey and David Lewis. By using this method, a set of theoretical terms appearing in a theory can be defined implicitly by the assertions of the theory itself.

Overview
A scientific theory which attempts to describe "electrons" is inherently abstract, as no one has ever observed an electron directly. Thus, the origin and content of the concept of "electron" is questionable. What does the word exactly signify? Ramsey and Lewis proposed that the meaning of the term "electron" is implicitly generated by the scientific theory that describes it, via all its assertions about electrons. Electrons are those things about which all the statements of the theory are true.

However, some of those statements in a theory refer to other unobserved entities and properties such as "charge" or "spin". For instance, "Electrons attract protons" and "Electrons have negative charge" employ the terms "protons" and "negative charge" (with the latter also implicitly using the concept of "charge"). These properties are formalized, statements (such as conditionals) are formed using them, and those statements taken together are the definition of the term.

Consider a sentence such as "There's an electron in the sink." This means something along the lines of: "There exist some properties P1, P2, ..., Pn ( one for every theoretical property involved in the scientific theory, with 'electronhood' (which roughly corresponds to the essence of an electron included as P1) such that... (a statement in the scientific theory, but with P1, ..., Pn substituted for the specific terms such as 'charge', 'is an electron', etc. employed by the theory), and there is something in the sink that has P1."

The process of converting the narrative form of a scientific theory into second-order logic is commonly called "Ramsification" (sometimes also spelled "Ramseyfication").

Example: Suppose there are only three principles in our scientific theory about electrons (those principles can be seen to be statements involving the properties):

A1. Electrons (things that have P1) have charge (P2).

A2. Things with charge (P2) tickle you.

A3. Electrons (things that have P1) cause lightning.

Furthermore, we include the property of "electronhood", as outlined above, to be designated by P1, and the property of "charge" to be designated by P2.

Then the meaning of a sentence such as "I have an electron in my pocket" is Ramsified into:

"There are properties P1 and P2 such that (things with P1 also have P2, and things with P2 tickle you, and things with P1 cause lightning, and there is a thing with P1 in my pocket)." (who cites .)

Notes

Sources

Originally published as  
 
 as cited by

External links
• An outline of the Ramsey–Lewis method

Philosophy of science